October Sky is a 1999 American biographical film directed by Joe Johnston based on the memoir by Homer Hickam, Jr.

October Sky may also refer to

October Sky (band)
October Sky (novel), (originally published as Rocket Boys), the 1998 memoir by Homer Hickam Jr

Music
October Sky EP, 2006 recording by October Sky
October Sky, 1999 soundtrack album by Mark Isham
October Sky, 2012 album by Stanfour